Aphanotorulus rubrocauda is a species of catfish in the family Loricariidae. It is a freshwater fish native to South America, where it occurs in the Aripuanã River basin in the states of Amazonas and Mato Grosso in Brazil. The species reaches at least 24.05 cm (9.5 inches) SL.

A. rubrocauda was described in 2017 by Andreza S. Oliveira and Lúcia H. Rapp Py-Daniel (both of the National Institute of Amazonian Research), as well as Cláudio H. Zawadzki (of the State University of Maringá) based on its distinctive morphology and coloration. FishBase does not list this species.

References 

Catfish of South America
Fish described in 2017
Loricariidae